Bob Martinson (born August 19, 1952) is an American politician. He is a member of the North Dakota House of Representatives from the 35th District, serving since 2000. He is a member of the Republican party.  Martinson also served in the House from 1972 to 1997 and as Majority Leader in 1993.

References

Living people
1952 births
Politicians from Bismarck, North Dakota
Republican Party members of the North Dakota House of Representatives
21st-century American politicians